The 1955 European Amateur Boxing Championships  were held in West Berlin, Germany, from May 27 to June 5. The 11th edition of the bi-annual competition was organised by the European governing body for amateur boxing, EABA. There were 153 fighters from 24 countries participating (among them Turkey, Egypt and Saara).

Medal winners

Medal table

External links
Amateur Boxing

European Amateur Boxing Championships
Boxing
European Amateur Boxing Championships
Boxing
International boxing competitions hosted by Germany